Juan Camilo Salazar López (born 28 February 1998) is a Colombian professional footballer who plays as a forward for Boyacá Chicó.

Career
Salazar's career started in Categoría Primera A with Boyacá Chicó. He made three appearances, notably for his debut versus Patriotas, throughout the 2018 season, which culminated with him netting his first professional goal on 9 November during a 2–2 draw against Atlético Huila; though the season ended with relegation.

Career statistics
.

References

External links

1998 births
Living people
People from Palmira, Valle del Cauca
Colombian footballers
Association football forwards
Categoría Primera A players
Boyacá Chicó F.C. footballers
Sportspeople from Valle del Cauca Department
21st-century Colombian people